Fabrice Taylor is a Canadian financial journalist, publisher and investor who writes a stock-market column in The Globe and Mail newspaper and Report on Business Magazine.

Career 
Since January, 2011, Taylor has authored and published The President’s Club Investment Letter, a joint-venture with The Globe and Mail. He also writes an associated investment blog. He is a frequent guest on the BNN network.

Early career 
Taylor began his journalism career at The Globe and Mail in 1995 and later became the paper’s capital markets columnist. He won a National Newspaper Award Citation of Merit in 2003 and that same year obtained his CFA designation.

Background 
Taylor's mother is from France and his father is English Canadian. His paternal grandfather, Reverend Dr. Robert L. Taylor, was the moderator of the Presbyterian Church of Canada.

References

External links
The President’s Club Investment Letter
investment blog. 

Businesspeople from Ontario
Canadian journalists
Canadian magazine publishers (people)
CFA charterholders
Canadian people of English descent
Canadian people of French descent
Canadian financial writers